Conan the Barbarian is a collection of five fantasy short stories by American writer Robert E. Howard, featuring his  sword and sorcery hero Conan the Barbarian, first published in hardcover by Gnome Press in 1955. The stories originally appeared in the 1930s in the fantasy magazine Weird Tales. This collection never saw publication in paperback; instead, its component stories were divided and distributed among other "Conan" collections. A later collection with the same title but different contents was issued in paperback by Del Rey/Ballantine Books in 2011.

Chronologically, the five short stories collected as Conan the Barbarian are the second in Gnome's Conan series; the stories collected as The Sword of Conan follow.

Contents
"Black Colossus"
"Shadows in the Moonlight"
"A Witch Shall be Born"
"Shadows in Zamboula"
"The Devil in Iron"

Notes

1955 short story collections
Conan the Barbarian books
Gnome Press books